Ryan Nicholas Jones (born March 28, 1945) is an American former professional basketball player. He played in both the National Basketball Association and American Basketball Association for a number of teams between 1967 and 1972.

Nick is the brother of Steve Jones, another former NBA and ABA player.

References

1945 births
Living people
Basketball players from Portland, Oregon
American men's basketball players
Dallas Chaparrals players
Golden State Warriors players
Miami Floridians players
Oregon Ducks men's basketball players
Point guards
San Diego Rockets draft picks
San Diego Rockets players
San Francisco Warriors players
Shooting guards